Cerauropeltis is a genus of trilobites in the order Phacopida that existed during the upper Ordovician of what is now New York, U.S.A. It was described by Pribyl and Vanek in 1985, and the type species is Cerauropeltis ruedemanni, which was originally described under the genus Ceraurus by Raymond in 1916. It was described from the Valcour Formation.

References

External links
 Cerauropeltis at the Paleobiology Database

Extinct animals of the United States
Fossil taxa described in 1985
Cheiruridae
Phacopida genera